Matthew Staton Bomer (born October 11, 1977) is an American actor. He is the recipient of accolades such as a Golden Globe Award, a Critics' Choice Television Award, and a Primetime Emmy Award nomination.

In 2000, he made his television debut on the long-running soap opera All My Children. Bomer graduated from Carnegie Mellon University with a Bachelor of Fine Arts degree. Soon after, he had a contract role on Guiding Light, as well as appearing on primetime shows, including Tru Calling.

In 2005, Bomer made his film debut in the mystery-thriller Flightplan, then in 2007 gained recognition with his recurring role in the NBC television series Chuck. 2009 saw Bomer then land the lead role of con-artist and thief Neal Caffrey in the USA Network series White Collar with the series lasting to 2014. He has featured in supporting roles in the 2011 science fiction thriller In Time, the 2012 comedy-drama Magic Mike and its 2015 sequel, the 2014 supernatural-drama Winter's Tale, and the 2016 neo-noir film The Nice Guys. In 2015, he won a Golden Globe Award and received a nomination for the Primetime Emmy Award for playing a closeted writer of The New York Times in the drama television film The Normal Heart about the rise of the HIV-AIDS crisis in New York City. Bomer made a guest appearance on the fourth season of FX's horror anthology series American Horror Story. He was later upgraded to the main cast during the fifth season. In 2017 he received praise for his performances in the drama films Walking Out, Anything, and the 2018 comedy-drama Papi Chulo. He portrays Larry Trainor in the DC Universe series Doom Patrol, which premiered in 2019.

On stage, Bomer starred in the Dustin Lance Black play 8 on Broadway, and at the Wilshire Ebell Theatre in Los Angeles as Jeff Zarrillo, a plaintiff in the federal case that overturned California's Proposition 8. In 2018 he starred in revival of the Mart Crowley play The Boys in the Band on Broadway playing Donald; he reprised his role for the 2020 film of the same name.

Early life and education
Matthew Staton Bomer was born in Webster Groves, Missouri, to Elizabeth Macy (née Staton) and John O'Neill Bomer IV. His father, a Dallas Cowboys draft pick, played for the team from 1972 to 1974. Matt Bomer has a sister, Megan Bomer, and a brother, Neill Bomer, who is an engineer. Bomer credits his own parents for being understanding when they sensed their young child was a little different from other kids. "I've always had an active imagination," says Bomer. He is a distant cousin to American singer Justin Timberlake. Bomer's family is of English, Welsh, Scottish, Irish, Swiss-German and French descent.

Bomer was raised in Spring, Texas, and attended Klein High School; he was a classmate of Lee Pace and Lynn Collins. In high school, Bomer followed in his dad's footsteps. He played wide receiver and defensive back for his school's football team before deciding to concentrate on acting.

At age 17, he made his professional stage debut as Young Collector in a production of Tennessee Williams A Streetcar Named Desire staged by the Alley Theatre in downtown Houston. He also appeared in a 1998 production of Joseph and the Amazing Technicolor Dreamcoat at the Utah Shakespeare Festival in Cedar City, Utah. Speaking about his first role in a production, Bomer said:
I started acting professionally when I was 17. I quit the team and did a production of A Streetcar Named Desire at the Alley Theatre in Houston. I used to drive down at the end of the school day, do the show, do my homework during intermission and drive an hour back to Spring to go to school the next day.

Bomer attended Carnegie Mellon University with fellow actor Joe Manganiello and graduated with a Bachelor of Fine Arts degree in 2001. In 1999, Bomer worked as a bartender while spending a year living in Galway, Ireland.

Career

2000–2004: Early roles 
Shortly after graduating from Carnegie Mellon University, Bomer moved to New York City, where he worked in theater and got his first role on television. His television debut came in 2000 on the ABC network, when he played Ian Kipling on the 1970s drama soap opera All My Children. Two years later he made a guest appearance in the mystery fantasy series Relic Hunter (2002).

In 2001, he landed a contract role on the soap opera Guiding Light. He played Ben Reade, a character connected to several core families on the show. When Bomer left the show in 2003, his exit was controversial; Ben was suddenly revealed to be a male prostitute and serial killer. He received a Gold Derby Awards for Younger Actor – Daytime Drama for his performance in the series. Years later in 2015, Bomer talked about his participation in the series, he said: "I told them to just throw the kitchen sink at me, and they did."

His next role was in the supernatural drama series Tru Calling (2003–2004). Starring alongside Eliza Dushku, Bomer starred as Luc Johnston the love interest of the protagonist of the series played by Dushku, in the first season. In 2003, Bomer returned to theatre to star in a Powerhouse Theater production of Paul Weitz's play Roullete in New York. A year later, he appeared in the episode Bellport in the primetime TV show of North Shore.

2005–2009: Transition to film and breakthrough with White Collar 
His screen debut occurred in the 2005 starring in the Robert Schwentke directed mystery thriller Flightplan, opposite Jodie Foster. Bomer's character was a flight attendant. The film grossed $223.3 million worldwide, becoming the seventeenth highest-grossing film of the year and Bomer's most lucrative film so far. In the slasher film The Texas Chainsaw Massacre: The Beginning (2006), Bomer portrayed Eric, a Vietnam War veteran who is driving across Texas to re-enlist after his brother is drafted. 
 
He acted in his first television film Amy Coyne (2006); he plays the role of Case. The film tells the story of a young woman who inherits her father's sports agency. His first leading role was in the series Traveler (2007), along with Logan Marshall-Green, Aaron Stanford and Viola Davis, a short-lived midseason replacement television series which premiered on ABC on May 30, 2007, the series tells the story of two graduate students, become suspected of terrorism after a skateboarding race inside a museum. The series was canceled after eight episodes.

He had a supporting role in the NBC action comedy spy-drama Chuck (2007–09). The series is about an "average computer-whiz-next-door" named Chuck Bartowski (played by Zachary Levi), who receives an encoded e-mail from Bomer's character, Bryce Larkin, an old college friend now working for the CIA. In 2007, Bomer took on the role of Ernest Hemingway in a Williamstown Theatre Festival production of Crispin Whittell's play Villa America in Massachusetts, starring in it with Jennifer Mudge and Nate Corddry.

2009 marked a significant turning point in Bomer's career as he starred as the con artist Neal Caffrey in the police procedural drama series White Collar. He was part of an ensemble cast that included Tim DeKay, Willie Garson, and Tiffani Thiessen. White Collar premiered on August 23, 2009, on USA Network and was watched by more than 5.40 million people. His performance as well as the rest of the cast were praised; Mary McNamara of the Los Angeles Times wrote: "terrific acting, crackling dialogue and geek-hip crime are not the only things that make this the most electric drama to premiere this fall." She also liked the performance of the two leads together saying they "are so easy" and "perfect together". He won a People's Choice Award at the 2015 ceremony. Additionally Bomer produced 19 episodes of White Collar along with DeKay.

2010–2015: Recognition 
2010 began with Bomer invited to sing with actress and Tony Award winning singer Kelli O'Hara at the Kennedy Center Honors. In September 2011, Bomer starred in Dustin Lance Black's play, 8, a staged re-enactment of the federal trial that overturned California's Proposition 8. Bomer starred as Jeff Zarrillo. The production was directed by actor Joe Mantello and presented at the Eugene O'Neill Theatre in New York City. In March 2012, he was featured in the Wilshire Ebell Theatre production as well.

In 2011, Bomer was cast as a 105-year-old man in Andrew Niccol's science fiction thriller film In Time, starring alongside Justin Timberlake. On April 10, 2012, Bomer made a guest appearance in the third season of the television series Glee, playing Blaine's older brother, Cooper Anderson, a Hollywood commercials actor who comes to Lima for a visit, and while in town gives an acting masterclass to New Directions. His performance on Glee received critical acclaim; critic Emily VanDerWerff of The A.V. Club described his performance as "absolutely fantastic." Crystal Bell of the Huffington Post called his appearance "perfectly cast" and Bomer as one of her favorite guest stars. For this performance on Glee, he won a Gold Derby award in the category of Best Comedy Guest Actor.

For his next film, Bomer starred opposite Channing Tatum in Steven Soderbergh's comedy drama Magic Mike (2012). He studied with a group called Hollywood Men in Los Angeles to prepare for the role. The film premiered as the closing film for the 2012 Los Angeles Film Festival on June 24, 2012. Magic Mike was a critical success and his performance was praised. Sara Stewart of the New York Post noted that; "Matt Bomer is also in fine form as a dancer, Ken, whose signature performance plays off his doll-like face." Bomer and Tatum were nominated for the MTV Movie & TV Awards at the 2013 ceremony in Best Musical Moment category.

Bomer made two appearances in 2013, the first as a guest performer on the NBC sitcom The New Normal, portraying the role Monty, ex-boyfriend of the protagonist of the series Bryan Collins played by Andrew Rannells. The second was to voice Superman in the direct to video Superman: Unbound, based on the 2008 comic book story "Superman: Brainiac" by Geoff Johns. His voiceover assured him an invitation to the Behind the Voice Actors Awards in 2013.

In 2014, Bomer appeared in five projects. His first two releases, Winter's Tale, and Space Station 76, were commercially unsuccessful.
The first film, a romantic and supernatural fantasy drama film, was written and directed by Akiva Goldsman, and based on Mark Helprin's novel Winter's Tale. Bomer plays the young father of Colin Farrell's character. Winter's Tale received negative reviews. His second release of the year was in the black space fiction comedy Space Station 76 by Jack Plotnick, alongside Liv Tyler and Patrick Wilson. James Rocchi of The Wrap said; "all the performers are game" and the performance of Bomer; "as a melancholy engineer with a prosthetic hand that looks like a Nintendo Power Glove".
 
Bomer's next project involved Ryan Murphy casting him opposite Mark Ruffalo, Jim Parsons and Julia Roberts in the drama romance film The Normal Heart (2014). Based on Larry Kramer's play of the same name, it featured Bomer as a closeted writer of The New York Times and love interest of Ruffalo's character. The film shows the rise of the HIV-AIDS crisis in New York City between 1981 and 1984, as seen through the eyes of writer/activist Ned Weeks (Ruffalo), the founder of a prominent HIV advocacy group. The production of The Normal Heart stopped for a few months while he was on a diet. Bomer's performance was praised by a reviewer for The Hollywood Reporter, who considered his acting as the highlight of the production. Matthew Gilbert of The Boston Globe noticed that Bomer is: "quite simply, devastating in this movie, his beauty adding resonance because it begins to fade so suddenly, as his cheeks protrude and lesions gather." Gilbert also lauded the chemistry between Bomer and Ruffalo saying that: "is among the movie's strengths, too, as it provides the core of love and compassion amid all the acrimony." Bomer received his first Golden Globe Award in the Best Supporting Actor category and his first Primetime Emmy Awards nomination.

After narrating the documentary Hunted: The War Against Gays in Russia, following LGBT people in Russia. later that year, Bomer was cast by Murphy in "Pink Cupcakes", an episode in the fourth season of American Horror Story. His participation was described by Lauren Piester of E! Online as "one of the show's most shocking moments". Bomer's first release of 2015 was Magic Mike XXL, a sequel to the popular 2012 film, again featuring Channing Tatum and Joe Manganiello. Magic Mike XXL grossed $122 million worldwide. Reviewing the film for Rolling Stones, Peter Travers noted that; "the movie is just a rambling, loosey-goosey road trip, with Bomer and Manganiello getting extra time to shine." He also sang two songs for the film's soundtrack: "Heaven" and "Untitled (How Does It Feel)". After Bomer's participation in American Horror Story: Freak Show; Murphy put him in the main cast of the fifth season, American Horror Story: Hotel. Bomer plays the son of Iris (Kathy Bates) and the lover of the Countess (Lady Gaga).

2016–present: Professional expansion, independent films and Broadway 

Bomer appeared in two films in 2016. He played for the first time a villain in the movie The Nice Guys, as a psycho killer named John Boy. Directed by Shane Black, starring Ryan Gosling and Russell Crowe. Gosling and Bomer were at the premiere of the film at the Cannes Film Festival in 2016. The Nice Guys generated positive reviews and enjoyed moderate box office success. His next role was as Matthew Cullen in Antoine Fuqua's Western action film The Magnificent Seven, playing the farmer husband of Haley Bennett's character. The film received mixed reviews from critics, although the cast and action sequences were praised, and grossed $162.4 million worldwide. He was cast as Monroe Stahr, the lead in Billy Ray's 2016 series The Last Tycoon, loosely based on the F. Scott Fitzgerald novel of the same name, along with actors Kelsey Grammer, Lily Collins, and Dominique McElligott.

In 2017, he starred in Alex & Andrew Smith's drama Walking Out, as an estranged father to a 14-year-old son (played by Josh Wiggins). He said that he related to the character "in a really profound way.” Walking Out was screened in the U.S. Dramatic Competition section of the 2017 Sundance Film Festival and was released on October 6, 2017. Justin Chang of Los Angeles Times noted that he "steps confidently into the boots of a rugged, know-it-all mountain man whose idea of tough love can turn unexpectedly toward tenderness around a flickering campfire." David Ehrlich of IndieWire stated that Bomer fortunately plays against his "pretty boy type so convincingly that you might forget where you’ve even seen him before", concluding that Bomer "gives a commanding performance in a movie that fails to realize how evocative he is, the Smiths defaulting to flashbacks that show us less about cowboys and gender codes than we can glean from the wild look in its lead actor’s face. The Village Voice included his performance in the film in a list of the 17 Most Overlooked Performances of 2017.

Timothy McNeil's drama Anything marked Bomer's final film release of 2017 and McNeil making his feature directorial debut. Bomer was cast as Freda Von Rhenburg, a transgender sex worker who lives in Los Angeles and begins a relationship with her neighbor, Early Landry (played by John Carroll Lynch). Anything is based on McNeil’s play of the same name. He has received some criticism from the transgender community for the casting of a cisgender man, to play a transgender woman. Jon Frosch of The Hollywood Reporter felt that Bomer: "gives a performance of real warmth and delicacy," saying that: "rather than play Freda as a force of nature or a collection of mannerisms—the typical default modes of actors playing trans women—Bomer renders her fully dimensional: an unpredictable tangle of impulses, by turns defensive and tender." Anything had its release at the Los Angeles Film Festival on June 17, 2017.

In 2018, Bomer began working on his directorial debut on series The Assassination of Gianni Versace: American Crime Story. Written by Tom Rob Smith and starring Jon Jon Briones and Darren Criss, in the roles of father and son, respectively, the episode that Bomer directs is titled "Creator/Destroyer". The episode was watched by more than 1 million people. Bomer had other opportunities to direct before but always wanted to wait for the optimum chance to immerse himself in a project. He read 3,000 pages of books on directing. He found a part in a 2018 revival of the Mart Crowley play The Boys in the Band, which was staged at Booth Theatre and marked his Broadway debut. Directed by Joe Mantello, it tells the story a group of gay men who gather for a birthday party in New York City. Theater critic Michael Sommers noted that "Matt Bomer tends to fade in the glare of flashier personalities, but he lends the character a watchful quality as one of those deferential souls who is content to observe others." The play won a Tony Award for Best Revival of a Play. Bomer's first film in 2018 was Bill Oliver's science fiction film Jonathan. His role was that of a detective who appears in only one scene of the film. Jonathan had its world premiere at the Tribeca Film Festival on April 21, 2018.

Two of Bomer's films in 2018 premiered at the 43rd Toronto International Film Festivalthe comedy drama Papi Chulo and the drama Viper Club. In the former, Bomer plays Sean, a local network television weather forecaster. A reviewer for Screen Daily argued that Bomer is "terrific" and concluded that "while he may not yet have the name recognition to act as a key selling point for this film, it’s the kind of performance which gets noticed". In Viper Club, Bomer played Sam, a journalist who helps Helen (played by Susan Sarandon), to save her son who was kidnapped by a group of terrorists. He had a guest starring role on the NBC series Will & Grace (2018–2019) and he also appeared as Negative Man in the DC Universe superhero series, Doom Patrol (2019).

In 2020, Bomer portrayed Jamie Burns on the USA Network anthology series The Sinner.

In the media 
Bomer has been noted for his looks, and is regarded as a sex symbol. BuddyTV ranked him first on its list of "TV's Sexiest Men of 2011" and third in 2012. In June 2013, Bomer was ranked at no. 2 on Logos Hot 100 list, which is based on the votes of readers of the AfterEllen.com and TheBacklot.com. Bomer was the list's highest ranked man and second only to Jennifer Lawrence.

Personal life
Bomer married publicist Simon Halls in 2011;
the marriage became public through the media only in 2014. In an interview discussing his marriage, Bomer said that his marriage to Halls was a very small event in New York City: "It was very chill and very small–just our closest and dear ones. There is a security, a validity. It's just a feeling, I think–something about saying vows in front of the people around you who love and support you. I think it was good for our family." The couple has three children conceived through surrogacy: Kit Bomer Halls (b. 2005), and then twin brothers, Walker and Henry Bomer Halls (b. 2008).

Bomer publicly came out as gay in 2012, when he thanked Halls and their children during an acceptance speech for his Steve Chase Humanitarian Award. Also in 2012, Bomer was given an Inspiration Award for his work at the GLSEN Awards. He is an LGBT rights activist.

In 2018, Bomer campaigned for Democratic candidate Beto O'Rourke in the U.S. Senate election in Texas.

Bomer has been practicing Transcendental Meditation since his early 20s; in 2013 he spoke of his support for the work of the David Lynch Foundation.

Acting credits and awards

According to the review aggregation website Rotten Tomatoes and box-office website The Numbers, Bomer's most critically and commercially successful films include Flightplan (2005), In Time (2011), Magic Mike (2012), Superman: Unbound (2013), The Normal Heart (2014), Magic Mike XXL (2015), The Magnificent Seven (2016), The Nice Guys (2016) and Walking Out (2017). Among his stage roles, he has appeared in a Broadway revival of The Boys in the Band (2018).

Throughout his career, Bomer has already won and been nominated for several awards, notably his Golden Globe Awards nomination for Best Supporting Actor-Series, Miniseries or Television Film, winning the prize in 2015, an indication to the Primetime Emmy Awards of Outstanding Supporting Actor in a Limited Series or Movie and the Critics' Choice Television Awards for Best Supporting Actor in a Movie/Miniseries in 2014, winning the award that year.

See also
 LGBT culture in New York City
 List of LGBT people from New York City

References

External links 

 
 
 
 

1977 births
20th-century American male actors
21st-century American male actors
American male film actors
American male soap opera actors
American male stage actors
American male television actors
American male voice actors
Best Supporting Actor Golden Globe (television) winners
Carnegie Mellon University College of Fine Arts alumni
American gay actors
American LGBT rights activists
LGBT people from Missouri
LGBT people from Texas
Living people
Male actors from Texas
People from Spring, Texas
People from St. Louis County, Missouri
Klein High School alumni